Walter Schindler (December 10, 1897 – April 3, 1991) was a highly decorated career officer in the United States Navy, who ultimately achieved the rank of Vice Admiral. He was later twice awarded the Legion of Merit.

Biography
Schindler was born on December 10, 1897 in New Glarus, Wisconsin, to S. A. Schindler and Anna Schindler. His father became a member of the Wisconsin State Assembly. Schindler graduated from the University of Wisconsin in Madison in 1917, before attending and graduating from the United States Naval Academy as a member of the Class of 1921.

In 1935 he was ordered to duty with the United States Asiatic Fleet, and on July 1, 1936, assumed his first command (of the minesweeper ).

In May 1942, Schindler flew  several missions in the back seat of Douglas SBD Dauntless dive bombers during the Battle of the Coral Sea. On May 7, he rode with future fighter ace Stanley "Swede" Vejtasa during the attack on the carrier Shoho, filming the naval battle unfolding below him. Schindler's footage was later used to develop future strategies for aircraft carrier combat.

On May 8, Commander Schindler flew as gunner to Lieutenant Turner Caldwell (Scouting 5's XO) in the attack on the carrier Shokaku. During their run, the SBDs were beset by Mitsubishi A6M2 Zero fighters. Schindler fired at any that came within range, claiming one destroyed. Schindler was considered the first U.S. serviceman to shoot down a Zero from the rear seat of a navy dive bomber.  His Navy Cross citation reads:

The President of the United States of America takes pleasure in presenting the Navy Cross to Commander Walter Gabriel Schindler, United States Navy, for extraordinary heroism and distinguished service in the line of his profession as Gunnery Officer on board the Aircraft Carrier U.S.S. YORKTOWN (CV-5), in action against enemy Japanese forces at Tulagi Harbor on 4 May 1942, and in the Battle of the Coral Sea on 7 and 8 May 1942. In order to advise his seniors more accurately and intelligently, Commander Schindler volunteered as free gunner in an airplane in Scouting Squadron FIVE (VS-5), attached to the U.S.S. YORKTOWN (CV-5), in three attacks against Japanese forces, at Tulagi on 4 May, although opposed by heavy anti-aircraft fire, and in two attacks on 7 and 8 May in the Coral Sea area, in the face of enemy fighters as well. He shot down a Zero type Japanese fighter which attacked the plane in which he was serving as free gunner on 8 May. His conspicuous intrepidity was above and beyond the call of duty on these occasions. Commander Schindler's conscientious devotion to duty and gallant self-command against formidable odds were in keeping with the highest traditions of the United States Naval Service.

His Silver Star citation reads:

The President of the United States of America takes pleasure in presenting the Silver Star to Commander Walter Gabriel Schindler, United States Navy, for conspicuous gallantry and intrepidity in action while serving as Gunnery Officer on the Staff of Task Force Commander for the first ten months of World War II.

Schindler commanded the Cleveland-class light cruiser  following the end of the war (from November 7, 1945 to July 24, 1946). He also served as chief of research for the Navy's Bureau of Ordnance, and chief of the U.S. naval mission in Chile. In the 1950s, he served as commanding officer of the Naval Ordnance Laboratory in White Oak, Maryland, commanded the cruiser division off the coast of Korea, then served as assistant Chief of Naval Operations for first operations and readiness. Starting in 1955, he commanded U.S. naval forces in Germany, before becoming the commandant of the Eighth Naval District, based in New Orleans, Louisiana, in 1958.

References

People from New Glarus, Wisconsin
Recipients of the Navy Cross (United States)
Recipients of the Silver Star
Recipients of the Legion of Merit
United States Navy admirals
United States Naval Academy alumni
University of Wisconsin–Madison alumni
United States Navy personnel of World War II
Military personnel from Wisconsin
1897 births
1991 deaths